Goniobranchus trimarginatus is a species of colourful sea slug, a dorid nudibranch, a marine gastropod mollusk in the family Chromodorididae.

Distribution
This species was described from Bombay, India. It is reported from the Northern Indian Ocean to Malaysia.

Description
Goniobranchus trimarginatus has a translucent white mantle covered with small irregular red spots and patches. At the edge of the mantle a dense band of white glands show through the skin and the mantle is edged with three thin bands, yellow, wine red and then at the extreme edge another thin white band. The gills and rhinophore clubs are translucent white with opaque white edging. The body reaches a length of 30 mm.

References

Chromodorididae
Gastropods described in 1946